Amandi is one of 41 parishes (administrative divisions) in Villaviciosa, a municipality within the province and autonomous community of Asturias, in northern Spain. 

The postal code is 33311.

Villages and hamlets

References

Parishes in Villaviciosa